Erica Ferencik is a Massachusetts-based novelist, screenwriter and stand-up comic.

Early life
Ferencik was born in Urbana, Illinois and later obtained a Bachelor of Arts degree in painting and French from University of Massachusetts and after a Master of Arts in creative writing from Boston University.

Ferencik did stand-up comedy for ten years at various comedy clubs in Boston and New York and was also a material writer for David Letterman during the early years of his national late-night show.

Writing career
In 2022, Ferencik released the novel "Girl in Ice", a psychological suspense thriller about a linguist who travels to an island off the northwest coast of Greenland in the attempt to communicate with a young girl found frozen in the ice.

Works
 Ghost wrote "The Mutation", one in a series by Katherine Applegate
 Novella "The Inheritance" a finalist in the 2005 Malahat Review Novella Competition
 Wrote and made the prizewinning short film "New Stepmom"
 Frequent writer/performer for National Public Radio's "Morning Edition"

Bibliography

Novels 
 "Girl in Ice", Gallery/Scout Press - 2022
 "Into the Jungle", Gallery/Scout Press - 2019
 "The River at Night" - 2017
 "Repeaters", Waking Dream Press - 2011
 Cracks in the Foundation, Waking Dream Press - 2008

Screenplays 
 Thriller screenplay, "Mob Dot Com", co-written with Rick D'Elia, optioned by Goodman Productions

Nonfiction 
 Radio My Way, Pearson Education - 2011

Awards
 Repeaters was awarded a starred Kirkus Review and named to Kirkus Reviews Best of 2012

References

Living people
American women novelists
American thriller writers
Boston University College of Arts and Sciences alumni
Novelists from Massachusetts
21st-century American novelists
American stand-up comedians
Screenwriters from Massachusetts
21st-century American women writers
Women thriller writers
1958 births
21st-century American comedians
21st-century American screenwriters